The Christian Specht Building is located at 1110 Douglas Street in downtown Omaha, Nebraska. It is the only existing building with a cast-iron facade known in Nebraska today, and one of the few ever built in the state. The building was deemed an Omaha landmark in 1981, and was listed on the National Register of Historic Places in 1977.

History
Designed by local architects Dufrene and Mendelssohn in 1884, the three-story Specht Building was modeled in the Italian Renaissance Revival Style. This was a popular style for cast-iron facade buildings. Christian Specht's company, the Western Cornice Works, manufactured the facade. The company was a manufacturer of galvanized iron cornices, finials and other metal building products. Today the building is renowned for its artistic value by representing this period's usage of iron.

Proposed demolition
In 2001 the Omaha Performing Arts Society, led by the publisher of the Omaha World-Herald, John Gottschalk, proposed building an arts center adjacent to the Specht Building. Plans called for the demolition of the entire block the Specht Building sits on, including the Specht and four neighboring historic buildings.

In 2001 the City of Omaha was presented with a US$90 million gift for a downtown performing arts center contingent on the demolition of the downtown block containing the Specht Building and three other restored historical buildings. Shortly thereafter, the Omaha City Council voted to condemn and immediately demolish the Specht Building and the three other buildings to make way for green space for the performing arts center. Before voting to demolish the Specht building, the City Council did not discuss the fact that since 1981 the Specht building had been a designated Landmark of the City of Omaha.

Early reports indicated that the historic buildings would stop the project from happening, particularly after the historic building owners secured a temporary restraining order against the City of Omaha that prevented city attorneys from using eminent domain to take the four buildings. Pressure upon the major donors of the performing arts center and the donors requested that the buildings be spared.

After negotiations the plans were saved and the location of the buildings was intact. However, during the demolition of the rest of the block, some of the historic buildings were badly damaged, with one of the buildings completely demolished. The Specht Building was remodeled thereafter and is now loft apartments.

See also
Page Brothers Building

References

External links

 Modern photo

History of Downtown Omaha, Nebraska
National Register of Historic Places in Omaha, Nebraska
Houses completed in 1884
Buildings and structures in Omaha, Nebraska
Italian Renaissance Revival architecture in the United States
Commercial buildings on the National Register of Historic Places in Nebraska
Cast-iron architecture in the United States